Sam Harrington Bryceland (born 14 July 1932) is a Scottish footballer who played for Morton, Dumbarton, Gloucester City and Worcester City.

References

1932 births
Scottish footballers
Greenock Morton F.C. players
Dumbarton F.C. players
Gloucester City A.F.C. players
Worcester City F.C. players
Scottish Football League players
Living people
Association football inside forwards